The Romaleidae or lubber grasshoppers are a family of grasshoppers, based on the type genus Romalea.  The species in this family can be found in the Americas.

Tribes and selected genera
The Orthoptera Species File Online database lists two subfamilies:

Bactrophorinae

Auth. Amédégnato, 1974; distribution: central and tropical South America.
 Bactrophorini (Amédégnato, 1974)
 Andeomezentia Amédégnato & Poulain, 1994
 Bactrophora Westwood, 1842
 Bora Amédégnato & Descamps, 1979
 Cristobalina Rehn, 1938
 Hyleacris Amédégnato & Descamps, 1979
 Mezentia Stål, 1878
 Panamacris Rehn, 1938
 Rhicnoderma Gerstaecker, 1889
 Silacris Amédégnato & Descamps, 1979
 Ophthalmolampini (Descamps, 1977)
 Adrolampis Descamps, 1977
 Aphanolampis Descamps, 1978
 Apophylacris Descamps, 1983
 Caenolampis Descamps, 1978
 Chromolampis Descamps, 1977
 Drypetacris Descamps, 1978
 Elutrolampis Descamps, 1978
 Euprepacris Descamps, 1977
 Habrolampis Descamps, 1978
 Hekistolampis Descamps, 1978
 Helicopacris Descamps, 1978
 Helolampis Descamps, 1978
 Lagarolampis Descamps, 1978
 Nautia Stål, 1878
 Nothonautia Descamps, 1983
 Ophthalmolampis Saussure, 1859
 Othnacris (Descamps, 1977)
 Peruviacris Descamps, 1978
 Poecilolampis Descamps, 1978
 Pseudonautia Descamps, 1978
 Tikaodacris Descamps, 1978
 Xenonautia Descamps, 1977
 Zoumolampis Descamps, 1978
 Taeniophorini (Brunner von Wattenwyl, 1893)
 Hylephilacris Descamps, 1978
 Megacephalacris Descamps & Amédégnato, 1971
 Megacheilacris Descamps, 1978
 Taeniophora Stål, 1873

Romaleinae

Auth. (Brunner von Wattenwyl, 1893), selected genera:
 Eurostacrini (Amédégnato, 1997)
 Eurostacris Descamps, 1978
 Pseudeurostacris Descamps, 1978
 Hisychiini (Descamps, 1979)
 Hisychius Stål, 1878
 Leguini (Amédégnato & Poulain, 1986)
 Ampiacris Amédégnato & Poulain, 1986
 Legua Walker, 1870
 Proracris Uvarov, 1940
 Phaeopariini (Giglio-Tos, 1898)
 Abila  Stål, 1878
 Phaeoparia Stål, 1873
 Procolpini (Giglio-Tos, 1898)
 Procolpia Stål, 1873
 Romaleini (Brunner von Wattenwyl, 1893)
 Dracotettix Bruner, 1889
 Phrynotettix Glover, 1872
 Romalea Serville, 1831 - monotypic - Romalea microptera (Palisot de Beauvois, 1817)
 Spaniacris Hebard, 1937
 Taeniopoda Stal, 1873
 Titanacris Scudder, 1869
 Tropidacris Scudder, 1869
 Tytthotyle Scudder, 1897
 Trybliophorini (Giglio-Tos, 1898)
 Trybliophorus Serville, 1831

Subfamily unassigned
Genus Quitus Hebard, 1924

References

External links

 
Orthoptera families
Taxa named by Carl Brunner von Wattenwyl